Pick Me may refer to:

 PickMe, a taxi-hailing app based in Sri Lanka
 Pick Me!, a British daytime game show
 "Pick Me" (song), a 2015 song used as the theme for the television contest show Produce 101
 "It's Me (Pick Me)", a 2017 song used as the theme for the television contest show Produce 101 Season 2
 "Nekkoya (Pick Me)", a 2018 song used as the theme for the television contest show Produce 48